Oggatonama is a 2016 Bangladeshi drama film directed and written by Tauquir Ahmed. It was selected as the Bangladeshi entry for the Best Foreign Language Film at the 89th Academy Awards, but it was not nominated. The film stars Fazlur Rahman Babu, Shahiduzzaman Selim, Mosharraf Karim, Nipun Akter, Shatabdi Wadud, and several others. Oggatonama was released on 19 August 2016 in Bangladesh by Impress Telefilm. It is typically about a Bangladeshi migrant who illegally entered the United Arab Emirates with a fake passport and dies in a fatal incident, but the Bangladesh police receives the wrong corpse.

Plot 
Asiruddin Pramanik, the son of Kifayet Uddin Pramanik (Fazlur Rahman Babu), goes to Ajman with a fake passport, identified as Sheikh Abdul Wahhab, bought from Ramjan (Shahiduzzaman Selim). A group of policemen, headed by MA Kuddus (Shatabdi Wadud), had to get the dead body of "Wahhab" after a deadly incident in Ajman had occurred, killing six people, and they first go to Shubgacha to confirm Wahhab's death to his family. As it turns out, Wahhab is alive and lives in Rome and formerly worked in Ajman, as confirmed by his father (Abul Hayat). It was later revealed that the one died in Ajman was, in fact, Asiruddin Pramanik, who went there with Wahhab's old passport tempered with Pramanik's photo.

Kifayet and Ramjan later go to the Shah Jalal International Airport to collect the dead body of Asir. While preparing to bury him, the body was apparently uncircumcised. Then, it was revealed that there was a mix up of the bodies. Beauty (Nipun Akter) who was supposed to go to Ajman as Pramanik's wife, had her police clearance ready, but later decides not to go there. Ramjan and Kifayet go to Dhaka again with Farhad (Mosharraf Karim) to go to various places and even the airport but none of them were willing to do anything with the body. MA Kuddus later contacts the Embassy of Bangladesh in the United Arab Emirates, and found out that Asir was actually dead and there is nothing to do if there is a mix up of bodies, since the six people who have died, including Asir himself, in the incident were unidentifiable. Kifayet decided to bury the body with his own hands.

Cast 
 Fazlur Rahman Babu as Kifayet Uddin Pramanik
 Shahiduzzaman Selim as Ramjan Ali
 Mosharraf Karim as Farhad
 Nipun Akter as Beauty
 Shatabdi Wadud as MA Kuddus (Officer in Charge)
 Abul Hayat as Wahab's father, Sheikh Abdul Hakim
Shahed Sharif Khan as Wadud
Shahed Ali
Robena Reza Jui
Ziaul Huq Kislu
Nazmul Huda Bacchu
Momen Chodhury

Awards

See also
 List of submissions to the 89th Academy Awards for Best Foreign Language Film
 List of Bangladeshi submissions for the Academy Award for Best International Feature Film

References

External links
 
 Oggatonama at Bangla Movie Database

2016 films
2016 drama films
2010s Bengali-language films
Bengali-language Bangladeshi films
Bangladeshi drama films
Films scored by Pintu Ghosh
Films directed by Tauquir Ahmed
Best Film Meril-Prothom Alo Critics Award winners
Best Film Bachsas Award winners
Best Film National Film Award (Bangladesh) winners
Impress Telefilm films